Bothrops chloromelas, the coastal lancehead or Inca forest pit viper, is a venomous species of pit viper found in South America.

Taxonomy and etymology
The species was first described in 1949 by Brazilian herpetologist Alphonse Richard Hoge.

Habitat
The species is native to montane forest at altitudes of 1,000-2,000 meters above sea level. It apperas to prefer primary to secondary forest.

References

Animals described in 1949
chloromelas